Elisa Berroeta Araya was a Chilean 20th-century engraver, illustrator, and visual artist. She is known as one of the first female artists awarded scholarships by the Chilean government for studies in Europe.

Biography 
Elisa Berroeta–Araya was born in the late 19th-century in Ovalle, in Coquimbo, Chile. She studied engraving at the Academy of Painting (Santiago, Chile) (formerly Escuela de Bellas Artes de Santiago) under French artist León Bazin.  

In 1905, Berroeta obtained a scholarship granted by the Chilean government to continue her artistic studies in Paris, where she lived and worked for three years. In that same year 1905, Chilean Zig Zag magazine named Berroeta, "a national artist (of Chile)" for her representation of her country abroad. From roughly the 1880s to 1920s, it was common for wood engravings to be used for fine-art reproduction and for illustration. In France she created many wood engraving reproductions of French art, some of which were published in Chilean Selecta magazine. 

Berroeta participated in the annual salon, Exhibition of Fine Arts, Santiago in 1904, 1906, and 1907. In 1904, she was awarded a third prize medal for her two engravings at the Exhibition of Fine Arts, Santiago.

References 

Chilean women illustrators
Chilean printmakers
20th-century Chilean women artists
Wood engravers
People from Ovalle
Academy of Painting (Santiago, Chile) alumni